The pale-throated wren-babbler (Spelaeornis kinneari) is a bird species in the family Timaliidae. It was until recently considered a subspecies of the long-tailed wren-babbler; the IUCN for example started recognizing it as distinct species in 2008.  It is endemic to Vietnam

Its natural habitat are subtropical or tropical moist montane forests. This is one of the common and widespread taxa in the Long-tailed wren-babbler species complex. However, due to its declining population & reduced habitat, it is currently classified as a Vulnerable species by the IUCN.

Footnotes

References
 BirdLife International (BLI) (2008): [2008 IUCN Redlist status changes]. Retrieved 2008-MAY-23.

pale-throated wren-babbler
Endemic birds of Vietnam
pale-throated wren-babbler